Cunninghame North was a county constituency represented in the House of Commons of the Parliament of the United Kingdom from 1983 until 2005.  Thereafter, it was largely replaced by North Ayrshire and Arran. It elected one Member of Parliament (MP) using the first-past-the-post voting system.

The Scottish Parliament constituency also called Cunninghame North continues in existence.

Boundaries
The Cunninghame District electoral divisions of Arran, Largs and West Kilbride; Garnock Valley; and Saltcoats and Ardrossan.

In 1996 the Cunninghame district was reconstituted as the North Ayrshire council area, but the constituency boundaries remained unchanged until the seat disappeared in 2005.

Members of Parliament

Election results

Elections of the 1980s

Elections of the 1990s

Elections of the 2000s

References 

Historic parliamentary constituencies in Scotland (Westminster)
Constituencies of the Parliament of the United Kingdom established in 1983
Constituencies of the Parliament of the United Kingdom disestablished in 2005
Politics of North Ayrshire
Ardrossan−Saltcoats−Stevenston
Garnock Valley
Isle of Arran
Largs